Edward Royal Warren (1860–1942) was an American naturalist and engineer.

Biography
Warren was born in 1860 in Waltham, Massachusetts where attended Massachusetts Institute of Technology from which he got bachelor's degree in 1881. He got his second bachelor's degree in 1883 from the Colorado College where by 1902 he became full-time naturalist. He was recognised in 1909 for his contributions to Colorado natural history and was made an honorary director of the Colorado College Museum. After it he wrote two books; one Mammals of Colorado was published in 1910, the other The Beaver: Its Work and Its Ways came out in 1927. He died in 1942.

References

External links
 

1860 births
1942 deaths
American engineers
Massachusetts Institute of Technology alumni